Agawam may refer to

Native Americans 
 Agawam tribe of Native Americans, eastern Essex County, Massachusetts, during colonial times, or their language

Places in the United States 
 Agawam, Kentucky, an unincorporated community
 Agawam, Massachusetts, a city
 Agawam, Montana, an unincorporated community
 Agawam, Oklahoma, a ghost town

Rivers 
 Agawam River in southeastern Massachusetts
 Westfield River in western Massachusetts, the lower parts of which were formerly known as the Agawam River

Structures 
 Camp Agawam, a boys summer camp in Raymond, Maine
 Agawam Diner in Massachusetts

Other 
 
 Agawam (grape), a hybrid grape variety